Mill of Secrets is a 1960 British television series. Produced by Associated Television and aired on ITV, it was a six-part children's adventure serial. According to IMDb, cast included Gene Anderson, Glyn Houston, Kenneth Watson, David Langford, Janet Bradbury and Sean Scully. The series exists in its entirety but has yet to appear on home video.

See also
The Voodoo Factor

References

External links
Mill of Secrets at IMDb

1960 British television series debuts
1960 British television series endings
1960s British children's television series
Black-and-white British television shows
English-language television shows
ITV television dramas